WCFS may refer to:

 WCFS-FM, a radio station (105.9 FM) licensed to Elmwood Park, Illinois, United States
 WCFS-LP, a low-power radio station (105.9 FM) licensed to Du Quoin, Illinois, United States